WQBR can refer to:

 WQBR (FM), an FM radio station licensed to Avis, Pennsylvania
 WQBR (AM), a campus radio station at Eastern Michigan University